Augusta and Savannah Railroad was incorporated in Georgia by special act of the General Assembly, approved December 31, 1838, as Augusta and Waynesboro Railroad Company. The name was changed to Augusta and Savannah Railroad on February 16, 1856.

Augusta and Savannah Railroad's property, including equipment, was leased to the Central Railroad and Banking Company of Georgia, after October 31, 1895 Central of Georgia Railway Company, on May 1, 1862, and again on October 24, 1895. It was absorbed by the Central of Georgia Railway in 1948.

See also 

 Confederate railroads in the American Civil War

Notes

References 
 Central of Georgia Railway Co., Volume 130, Interstate Commerce Commission Reports, p. 43 et seq. Washington: United States Government Printing Office.

Defunct Georgia (U.S. state) railroads
Predecessors of the Central of Georgia Railway
Railway companies established in 1838
Railway companies disestablished in 1948
History of Augusta, Georgia
1838 establishments in Georgia (U.S. state)
5 ft gauge railways in the United States
American companies established in 1838
American companies disestablished in 1948